"C'era un ragazzo che come me amava i Beatles e i Rolling Stones" ('There was a young man who, just like me, loved the Beatles and the Rolling Stones') is a song composed by Mauro Lusini and Franco Migliacci, and performed by Gianni Morandi. The song premiered at the third Festival delle Rose, in which Morandi presented the song in couple with the author Lusini. A protest ballad against Vietnam war,  it was censored by RAI television and radio for being polemic towards the policies of an allied state. The B-side of the single is "Se perdo anche te", a cover of Neil Diamond's "Solitary Man". Both songs are arranged by Ennio Morricone.

The single peaked at first place for three consecutive weeks in February 1967 on the Italian hit parade. 
 
The song was later covered by several artists, including Joan Baez, Lucio Dalla, Fiorello, Os Incríveis, Engenheiros do Hawaii, Poyushchiye Gitary and Yegor Letov.

Track listing
7" single – PM45 3375  
 "C'era un ragazzo che come me amava i Beatles e i Rolling Stones" (Mauro Lusini, Franco Migliacci) - 3:05
 "Se perdo anche te" (Neil Diamond, Franco Migliacci, Antonio Bazzocchi) - 2:26

References

1966 singles
Italian songs
Number-one singles in Italy
1966 songs
Anti-war songs
Joan Baez songs
Gianni Morandi songs
Songs with lyrics by Franco Migliacci
 
RCA Records singles